Tectiviridae is a family of viruses with 10 species in five genera. Bacteria serve as natural hosts. Tectiviruses have no head-tail structure, but are capable of producing tail-like tubes of ~ 60×10 nm upon adsorption or after chloroform treatment. The name is derived from Latin tectus (meaning 'covered').

Virology

The virions of Tectiviridae species are non-enveloped, icosahedral and display a pseudo T=25 symmetry. The capsid has two layers. The outer layer is a protein structure of 240 capsid proteins trimers, and the inner one is a proteinaceous lipid membrane which envelopes the virus genome. Apical spikes extending about 20 nanometers (nm) protrude from the icosahedrons vertices.

The genome is a single molecule of linear double-stranded DNA of 15 kilobases in length, and has 30 open reading frames. It forms a tightly packed coil and encodes several structural proteins. It encodes about 30 proteins that are transcribed in operons. At least 9 structural proteins are present in the viron. The genome is about 66 megaDaltons in weight and constitutes 14–15% of the virion by weight. Lipids constitute a further 15% by weight. Carbohydrates are not present.

Life cycle
Viral replication is cytoplasmic. Entry into the host cell is achieved by adsorption into the host cell. After adsorption to the host cell surface the virion extrudes a tail-tube structure through a vertex for genome delivery into the host. Replication follows the DNA strand displacement model. DNA-templated transcription is the method of transcription. Capsid proteins polymerize around a lipoprotein vesicle translocated in the cytoplasm by virion assembly factors.

Mature virons are released by lysis, which, in the case of PRD1, is achieved with the aid of virus-encoded lysis machinery consisting of four proteins: P15 (endolysin), P35 (holin), P36 and P37 (homologues of the Rz/Rz1 proteins of phage lambda).

Taxonomy
Tectiviridae contains the following genera and species:
 Alphatectivirus
 Pseudomonas virus PR4
 Pseudomonas virus PRD1
 Betatectivirus
 Bacillus virus AP50
 Bacillus virus Bam35
 Bacillus virus GIL16
 Bacillus virus Wip1
 Deltatectivirus
 Streptomyces virus Forthebois
 Streptomyces virus WheeHeim
 Epsilontectivirus
 Rhodococcus virus Toil
 Gammatectivirus
 Gluconobacter virus GC1

Other unassigned phages:
 Thermus virus phiKo
 Microbacterium virus Badulia
 Microbacterium virus MuffinTheCat

References

Further reading
 ICTVdB—The Universal Virus Database ICTVdB Management (2006). 00.068. Tectiviridae. In: ICTVdB—The Universal Virus Database, version 3. Büchen-Osmond, C. (Ed), Columbia University, New York, USA
 Virus Taxonomy: Eighth Report of the International Committee on Taxonomy of Viruses H.V. Van Regenmortel, D.H.L. Bishop, M. H. Van Regenmortel, Claude M. Fauquet (Eds)
 68.0.1. Tectivirus

External links
 Viralzone: Tectivirus
 ICTV

 
Bacteriophages